Steinn may refer to:

Andri Steinn (born 1979), Icelandic film editor
Guðmundur Steinn Gunnarsson (born 1982), Icelandic composer
Hallar-Steinn, Icelandic poet active around the year 1200
Snorri Steinn Gudjonsson (born 1981), Icelandic handball player
Steinn O. Thompson (1893–1972), politician in Manitoba, Canada
Steinn Steinarr (1908–1958), Icelandic poet

See also
Völu-Steinn, Icelandic skald of the mid-10th century
Stein (disambiguation)
Steina
Steine (disambiguation)
Steinnes